Vennesland is a Norwegian surname. Notable people with the surname include:

 Birgit Vennesland (1913—2001), Norwegian-American biochemist
 Line Vennesland (born 1985), Norwegian politician

Surnames of Norwegian origin
Norwegian-language surnames